Orlando Luz and Marcelo Zormann were the defending champions, but they chose to participate at the Pan American Games instead.

Lý Hoàng Nam and Sumit Nagal, won the title defeating Reilly Opelka and Akira Santillan, 7–6(7–4), 6–4 in the final.

Seeds

Draw

Finals

Top half

Bottom half

External links 
 Main draw

Boys' Doubles
Wimbledon Championship by year – Boys' doubles